Bailey Ryon (born May 20, 2002) is a child actress from Southern Pennsylvania. She is known for originating the role of Matilda in Matilda the Musical on Broadway with fellow actresses Milly Shapiro, Oona Laurence, and Sophia Gennusa. She performed in Matilda from March 2013 to January 11, 2014. Her role in Matilda won her a Tony Honors for Excellence in the Theatre which she won jointly with her fellow Matildas. The Original Broadway Cast recording of Matilda the Musical was nominated for a Grammy Award for Best Musical Theater Album where she was listed as a principle soloist along with Bertie Carvel, Sophia Gennusa, Oona Laurence, Milly Shapiro and Lauren Ward.
Before making her Broadway debut in Matilda the Musical, Bailey was Cindy Lou Who in the touring production of How the Grinch Stole Christmas. Currently, Bailey is studying musical theatre at James Madison University.

Credits

Theatre

Dance

References

2002 births
Living people
American child actresses
American musical theatre actresses
21st-century American actresses